Rarities – Volume 1 is a digital-only 11-track compilation by English soprano Sarah Brightman. The tracks on this volume are extracted from the master tapes for the long sold-out special edition tour CD release of Fly (1995). This compilation contains a previously unreleased demo of “One Day I’ll Fly Away” with the Royal Philharmonic Orchestra and an unreleased version of Morricone's “Once Upon a Time in the West”
 
An audio commentary track by Sarah and producer Frank Peterson is included. The album was released on December 18, 2015 and was exclusively available for digital download for a limited time.

Track listing

References 

2015 compilation albums
Sarah Brightman albums